Juzir (also Romanized as Jūzīr; also known as Jāz, Jowzān, and Jūzīn) is a village in Rudkhaneh Bar Rural District, Rudkhaneh District, Rudan County, Hormozgan Province, Iran. At the 2006 census, its population was 291, in 61 families.

References 

Populated places in Rudan County